Saint Achilles may refer to:

Saint Achilles, one of the duo of martyr saints Saints Nereus and Achilleus
Achilles of Larissa (died 330) 
Achilleus Kewanuka (1869–1886)